Big Brother 1 is the first season of the Belgian version of Big Brother aired in the Flemish Region of Belgium on Kanaal 2.

The show started on 3 September 2000 and finished on 17 December 2000 with a total duration of 106 days. Steven won 5,000,000 BEF. The kick-off show had immediately high ratings with 711,000 viewers. The highlights shows had around 800,000 viewers, the live shows got more than 1 million. The highlight of the season was the charity task, called Big Benefiet. The housemates collected more than 7 million BEF in a week. 13 housemates participated in this season. The housemates were very creative, making mini shows themselves during their stay. One of those shows named Studio Spillonimo even became an epilogue of some of the Big Brother highlights episodes. This season was the first Big Brother season ever where all-female housemates were evicted before the first male housemate was evicted.

1,584,000 viewers watched the final with 1,895,000 viewers at the moment of Steven Spillebeen was announced the winner. The ratings of this season were the most successful of all Big Brother seasons worldwide at the time.

The theme song "Leef" ("Live"), sung by band Mozaiek and Walter Grootaers remained number 1 in the hit list on Ultratop for seven weeks. The housemates' Christmas song "Brief voor Kerstmis" ("A letter for Christmas") was also ranked number 1 for three weeks. The housemates were instantly famous and were filmed in the reality documentary Het leven na Big Brother - The life after Big Brother which chronicled their lives after participating.

Format
The program was first seen as a social experiment where people had to live, work together and interact which each other in a very close environment, the Big Brother house. The cameras recorded every minute of this process. At set times all participants, called housemates, had to nominate two of their fellow housemates to put up for eviction. The two housemates with the most nominations faced eviction by the audience. This made it important for the ultimate winner to be liked inside but also outside the house. The nomination process was mandatory. The nominations went on until the final week. At the final week, the public could vote for all the remaining housemates to win.

Similar to the first Big Brother in the Netherlands, the theme was Back to Basics. There was only one shower (with warm water until 10:00 am), one toilet and the furniture was basic. There wasn't much privacy, since there were only two shared bedrooms. Each housemate had a daily budget of 150BEF. Housemates could improve their situation and weekly budget by doing weekly tasks. If those tasks completed successfully, housemates would receive a higher budget. If the tasks failed, the budget would be tightened.

Big Brother was the unseen leader of the house who observed everything in his house. Each housemate was obligated to spend each day some minutes in the Diary Room where the housemate could share their thoughts and feelings with Big Brother.

Housemates

Weekly summary

Nominations table

Notes
: Ten housemates entered the House on Day 1 and on Day 2 Edith and Murielle followed. However, on Day 5 the housemates had to choose one of these housemates to evict. Each voted for one of the housemates to stay, and all housemates chose Edith to stay, meaning Murielle was Evicted.
: After Nathalie walked, the public was allowed to choose her replacement. They had a choice between Caroline and Isabelle, and they chose Isabelle with 73.5% of the vote.
: This week, the public voted for a winner, rather than to evict.

External links
 World of Big Brother

References

01
2000 television seasons